Electric Jukebox was a digital media player developed by The Electric Jukebox Company. Designed as a dongle, and a "Nintendo Wii style" motion-sensitive controller with a built-in microphone for voice search, the device played music audio content on a high-definition television and home audio system by directly streaming it via Wi-Fi from the Internet.

Electric Jukebox combined hardware, software and premium music streaming access into one package; Ars Technica described it as "a box with everything you need to get started in streaming music".

Hardware

Electric Jukebox stick

Electric Jukebox dongle had a HDMI plug built into the body of the device. The dongle was powered by mains power through an integrated power cable. Electric Jukebox ran on a Rockchip processor. The dongle contained a 3.5mm audio jack as a line out to HiFi’s and speaker systems.

Electric Jukebox controller

Electric Jukebox Controller was a motion sensitive remote control with built-in gyroscope and accelerometer to position itself in space in relation to the cursor on the TV screen. The controller also had a microphone for voice search. The controller used HDMI-CEC protocols to switch between other devices on the television without needing to use the television set’s remote to change to or from Electric Jukebox.

Software

Electric Jukebox ran on a heavily modified version of the Android operating system.  The front end user interface was built in HTML5 enabling OTA updates which negate users from having to perform software upgrades or app downloads normally required when using music streaming services on computers, smartphones and televisions.

User interface

Electric Jukebox’s user interface incorporated neon iconography and music songs and albums represented as spinning disks - a digital manifestation of a physical music product; a CD. The user interface was met with mixed reaction from commentators; several technology focused media outlets have said the user interface is overly simple in comparison to other services while mainstream consumer media view the simplicity of Electric Jukebox as opening up music streaming to audiences who are alienated by the complexities of music streaming. CNET commented “Here's an easy way to think about Electric Jukebox: Remember when the Nintendo Wii came out, and suddenly the whole family, who didn't know their Atari from their elbow, was jumping around the living room playing video games? Spotify is the PlayStation, Sonos is the Xbox -- and Electric Jukebox is the Wii.”

Features

Voice search

The Electric Jukebox controller's built-in microphone provided access to the full catalogue of music. Voice activated functionality was provided by Nuance.

Celebrity playlists

Electric Jukebox featured exclusive playlists from a range of celebrities including; Robbie Williams and his wife Ayda Field, Sheryl Crow, Alesha Dixon and Stephen Fry.

Curated music channels

7 Digital provided a range of curated music channels for Electric Jukebox.

Music recommendations

Danish music tech company Moodagent provided music discovery and recommendations features for Electric Jukebox.

Playlist creation

Electric Jukebox users could create their own playlists using the Electric Jukebox Controller.

Music catalogue

Electric Jukebox had a library of music of "over 29 million songs" from all major and independent record labels and publishers including Universal Music Group, Sony Music Entertainment, Warner Music Group, Merlin, PIAS, Believe Digital and INgrooves.

Geographic availability

Electric Jukebox was available in:

See also 
 Comparison of on-demand streaming music services
 List of online music databases
 List of Internet radio stations

 Apple Music
 Spotify
 Deezer
 Tidal
 Rhapsody
 Napster
 Pandora Radio
 IHeartRadio
 SoundCloud
 Amazon Fire TV
 Chromecast
 Roku
 Sonos
 Pure
 Roberts Radio

References

Streaming media systems
Jukebox-style media players
Digital media players
Audio electronics
Android (operating system) software
Online music database clients
Online music stores of the United Kingdom
Companies based in the London Borough of Islington
Internet radio in the United Kingdom
Products introduced in 2015
2015 software
Internet properties established in 2014